Rana Pratap Nagar railway station (station code: RPZ) is the second railway station in Udaipur, Rajasthan, India, besides the main Udaipur City railway station. The railway station is under the administrative control of North Western Railway of Indian Railways.

Overview
Rana Pratap Nagar railway station has two platforms and has a single electrified BG track. It is situated in Khempura, near Thokar Chouraha, around 3 km from the city center, and around 18 km from Udaipur Airport. Its main purpose of building this station was to decongest the main Udaipur City railway station.

Important trains

See also
 Udaipur
 Udaipur Airport
 Udaipur City Bus Depot
 Udaipur City railway station

References 

Buildings and structures in Udaipur
Railway stations in Udaipur district
Transport in Udaipur
Ajmer railway division